Oregon's 2006 statewide election included a May 16 primary election and a November 7 general election.

Ten statewide ballot measures were on the November ballot.

The following offices were up for election: Governor, Supreme Court Position 6 (to succeed Wallace P. Carson, Jr.), and numerous seats in the state legislature (House of Representatives and Senate), the state Circuit Courts, and the District Attorney's offices.

Offices that were uncontested, or local to various towns, counties, or regions, were also on Oregon ballots. Such races are not listed on this page.

Election process 
Both partisan and non-partisan offices were at stake in the 2006 election cycle. Oregon conducts partisan and non-partisan elections differently:

 For partisan offices (such as the state legislature and governor's races), major parties (Democratic and Republican) run candidates in the Primary to select their nominee for the General Election. (The state takes on the administrative and financial burden of primaries for the two major parties, while other parties determine their candidate according to whatever nominating process they choose.) A plurality (that is, more votes than any opponent) is sufficient for a major party candidate to win nomination; candidates need not get more than 50% of the vote to advance to the General Election.

 Non-partisan offices (such as judges, district attorneys, and superintendent) may be filled in the Primary, if any candidate wins a majority of the vote. If no candidate wins over 50% of the vote, however, the top two vote-winners will face each other in a runoff in the November General Election.

County governments conduct the elections. Immediately after an election, their web sites
are the best place to find accurate election results. The Secretary of State's office posts official results 30 days after an election.

Voter statistics and turnout 
According to the Annual Oregon Population Report for 2005, the total estimated population of Oregon as of July 1, 2005 was 3,631,440, of which 2,765,827 were of voting age. Of these, 69,146 were ineligible to vote due to legal impediments, leaving an estimated 2,696,681 Oregonians eligible to vote. 1,976,669 voters were in fact registered for the 2006 election, 73.3% of those estimated eligible, and 70.8% of these registered voters or 1,399,650 voters actually did cast their ballots.

Key: abbreviations of Oregon political parties 

 (I) Independent Party of Oregon
 (C) Constitution Party of Oregon
 (D) Democratic Party of Oregon
 (G) Pacific Green Party of Oregon
 (L) Libertarian Party of Oregon
 (R) Republican Party of Oregon
 (N) non-affiliated (no party affiliation)

Candidates (Legislative)

U.S. Congress 

 All five of Oregon's federal congressional districts in the U.S. House of Representatives were up for election in 2006. All incumbents (four Democrats, one Republican) won re-election.

 Neither of Oregon's US Senate seats was up for election in 2006.

Current US Senators for Oregon:
 Gordon Smith (R)
 Ron Wyden (D)

State Legislature 
In the bicameral Oregon Legislative Assembly, each of the 30 Senate districts is composed of exactly two House districts.
Detailed district boundaries may be found at the Secretary of State's web site.

Oregon's State House in its entirety comes up for election in even numbered years. All 60 biennially elected seats in the House were up for election. Each seat has a 2-year term with no term limits. The Democrats won in 31 of 60 districts, gaining four seats and control of Oregon's State House for the first time since 1990.

Oregon State Senators serve four-year terms without term limits. Their terms are staggered so that only half of the Senators are up for re-election every two even-numbered years.

The Republicans lost one seat in the State Senate, because Senator Westlund, although not up for election, switched first to non-partisan Independent to challenge for the Governor's seat, then withdrew from that race and re-registered as a Democrat, gaining the Democrats one seat. The Democrats, however, also lost Senator Gordly, who was not up for election either, but she re-registered as a non-partisan Independent. Outside the party changes by these two individual Senators, no other seats in the Senate shifted party as a result of the election, although three incumbents declined to run for various reasons and another lost his primary.

Most races were not strongly contested in the General Election. In 60% of the legislative races, the "underdog" candidate raised less than 25% of the funds his or her opponent raised. Also, in 85% of the 75 legislative races, the winner was the candidate who raised more money.

Candidates for the Oregon Senate and House are listed in the chart below. House districts are listed next to the Senate district to which they belong (rather than listing the Senate and House in separate charts.) The counties covered by each Senate district are listed in italics, with (parentheses) if the county extends into other districts. Box colors indicate party affiliation for both incumbents and General Election winners (light blue for Democrats, light red for Republicans). Names and statistics of General Election winners are also boldfaced.

For primary candidates, see Oregon primary election, 2006.

Results 
{| class="wikitable"
|- style="color:darkgreen"
! width=100 | Senate District, incumbent, county(s)
! width=100 | House District, incumbent
! width=100 | Notes
! width=175 | Candidates
! width=30 | Votes Garnered
! width=20 | Margin
|- valign="top"
| rowspan=3| 1 Jeff Kruse (R)
Curry (Coos) (Douglas)
| colspan=3| This senate seat not up for election in 2006
|
|-
|  |1 Wayne Krieger (R)
|
| Wayne Krieger (R)  Robert Taylor (L)  Write-ins
|  | 16,736  5,861  182
|  | 73.47%  25.73%    .80%
|-
|  |2 Susan Morgan (R)
| Morgan ran unopposed
| Susan Morgan (R)   Write-ins
|  | 16,962  453
|  | 97.40%  2.60%
|- valign="top"
| rowspan=3| 2 Jason Atkinson (R)
Josephine
| colspan=3| This senate seat not up for election in 2006
|-
|  |3 Gordon Anderson (R)
| Anderson announced resignation after Primary filing deadline
| Ron Maurer (R)  Howard Owens (D)   Write-ins
|  | 14,394  8,645  47
|  | 62.35%  37.45%  .20%
|-
|  |4 Dennis Richardson (R)
| * editorial by Richardson
| Dennis Richardson (R)  Richard Koopmans (D)  Write-ins
|  | 16,604  7,214  71
|  | 69.50%  30.20%  .30%
|- valign="top"
| rowspan=3| 3 Alan C. Bates (D)
Jackson
|
| 
| Alan C. Bates (D)  Lynn Aiello(R)  Write-ins
|  | 30,552  17,321  92
|  | 63.7%  36.11%  .19%
|-
| | 5 Peter Buckley (D)
| Buckley ran unopposed
| Peter Buckley (D)  Write-ins
| | 19,310  496
| | 97.50%  2.50%
|-
| |6 Sal Esquivel (R)
| 
| Sal Esquivel(R)  Mike Moran (D)  Write-ins
| | 11,423  10,541  43
| | 51.91%  47.90%  .20%
|- valign="top"
| rowspan=3| 4 Floyd Prozanski (D)
(Douglas) (Lane)
|
|
| Floyd Prozanski (D)  Bill Eddie (R)  Write-ins
| | 30,402  17,327  96
| | 63.57%  36.23%  .20%
|-
| | 7 Bruce Hanna (R)
| Laura Aviani-Skinner (I) filed but did not qualify, for the third time.
| Bruce Hanna (R)  Write-ins
| | 15,505  664
| | 95.89%  4.11%
|-
| | 8 Paul Holvey (D)
| 
| Paul R. Holvey (D)  Andrew Hill (R)  Write-ins
| | 18,481  5,460  63
| | 76.99%  22.75%  .26%
|- valign="top"
| rowspan=3| 5 Joanne Verger (D)
Lincoln (Lane) (Douglas) (Coos) (Yamhill) (Tillamook)
| colspan=3| This senate seat not up for election in 2006
|
|-
| |9 Arnie Roblan (D)
| 
| Arnie Roblan (D)  Al Pearn (R)  Write-ins
| | 13,340  9,793  32
| | 57.59%  42.27%  .14%
|-
| | 10 Alan Brown (R)
| 
| Jean Cowan (D)  Alan Brown (R)  Write-ins
| | 12,904  12,112  68
| | 51.44%  48.29%  0.14%
|- valign="top"
| rowspan=3| 6 Bill Morrisette (D)
(Lane) (Linn)
| 
| 
|Bill Morrisette (D)  Renee Lindsey (R)  Write-ins
| |14,753  30,161  99
| |32.77%  67.01%  0.22%
|-
| |11 Phil Barnhart (D)
| 
| Phil Barnhart (D)  J. Oakley (R)  Write-ins
| | 16,206  10,009  57
| | 61.69%  38.10%  0.22%
|-
| | 12 Elizabeth Terry Beyer (D)
|
| Terry Beyer (D)  Bill Lioio (R)  Write-ins
| | 11,015  6,093  36
| | 64.25%  35.54%  0.21%
|- valign="top"
| rowspan=3|7 Vicki Walker (D)
(Lane)
| 
| 
| Vicki Walker (D)  Jim Torrey (R)  Write-ins
| | 25,667  23,962  134
| | 51.58%  48.15%  0.27%
|-
| | 13 Robert Ackerman (D)
|Thomas Ray Albright, Republican nominee, withdrew August 1; replaced by Monica Johnson, loser of Republican primary to challenge for Oregon's 4th District U.S. House. That challenge was also lost.
| Nancy Nathanson (D)  Monica Johnson (R)  Write-ins
| | 17,505  6,622  73
| | 72.33%  27.36%  0.30%
|-
| |14 Debi Farr (R)
|
| Chris Edwards (D)  Debi Farr (R)  Write-ins
| |12,320  11,257  56
| |52.13%  47.63%  0.24%
|- valign="top"
| rowspan=3| 8 Frank Morse (R)
(Benton) (Linn)
| 
| 
| Frank Morse (R) Mario E. Magana  Write-ins
| |27,127  18,767  134	
| |58.94%  40.77%  0.29%
|-
| |15 Andy Olson (R)
| 
| Andy Olson (R)  Sam H.W Sappington (D)  Write-ins
| | 16,317  7,634  47
| | 67.99%  31.81%  0.20%
|-
| | 16 Sara Gelser (D)
|
| Sara Gelser (D)  Robin M. Brown (R)  Write-ins
| | 15,058  7,252  40		
| | 67.37%  32.45%  0.18%
|- valign="top"
| rowspan=3| 9 Roger Beyer (R)

(Clackamas) (Linn)
| colspan=3| This senate seat not up for election in 2006
| 
|-
| |17 Jeff Kropf (R)
| Kropf dropped out of the race in July. Girod was chosen 8/13 as the new nominee. (another article in Albany Democrat-Herald)
| Fred Girod (R)  Dan  Thackaberry (D)  Write-ins
| |12,658 8,682  91
| |59.06%  40.51%  0.42%
|-
| |18 Mac Sumner (R)
| Sumner announced his resignation shortly after winning the election.
| Mac Sumner (R)  Jim Gilbert (D)  Roger Shipman (C)  Write-ins
| | 11,526  9,840  504  34
| | 52.62%  44.92%  2.30%  0.16%
|- valign="top"
| rowspan=3| 10 Jackie Winters (R)
(Marion)
|  
| 
|Jackie Winters (R)  Paul Evans (D)  Write-ins
| |24,641  21,232  99
| |53.60%  46.18%  0.22%
|-
| | 19 Kevin Cameron (R)
| Jerry DeFoe was chosen 6/3 as the Libertarian nominee, filed 6/5, then withdrew 6/23 and instead challenged for Oregon's 5th District U.S. House seat and lost.
|Kevin Cameron (R)  Brian Grisham (D)  Write-ins
| | 12,506  9,529  54	
| | 56.62%  43.14%  0.24%
|-
| |20 Vicki Berger (R)
| 
|Vicki Berger (R)  Connie Garcia (D)  Write-ins
| | 13,382  9,040  79
| | 59.47%  40.18%  0.35%
|- style="color:darkgreen"
! Senate District, incumbent, county(s)
! House District, incumbent
! Notes
! Candidates
! Votes Garnered
! Margin
|- valign="top"
| rowspan=3| 11 Peter Courtney (D)
(Marion)
|
| 
| Peter Courtney(D)  Jared Thatcher (R)  Keith Humphrey (C)  Write-ins
| |15,593  10,814  767  49	
| |57.28%  39.72%  2.82%  0.18%
|-
|  | 21 Billy Dalto (R)
|                                                                                               August article in Statesman-Journal
| Brian Clem (D)  Billy Dalto (R)  Write-ins
| | 9,598  6,025  101		
| | 61.04%  38.32%  0.64%
|-
| |22 Betty Komp (D)
| 
| Betty Komp (D)  Carl Wieneke (R)  Michael Marsh (C)  Write-ins
| | 5,830  5,090  381  22 
| | 51.49%  44.95%  3.36%  0.19%
|- valign="top"
| rowspan=3| 12 Gary George (R)
(Polk) (Yamhill)
| colspan=3| This senate seat not up for election in 2006
|
|-
| | 23 Brian Boquist (R)
| 
| Brian Boquist (R)  Jason Brown (D)  Paul Delaney (L)  Write-ins
| | 13,422  8,760  942  27
| | 57.98%  37.84%  4.07%  0.12%
|-
| | 24 Donna G. Nelson (R)
| Statesman Journal Endorses Peralta, News Register Endorses Peralta
| Donna G. Nelson (R)   Sal Peralta (D)  David Terry (L)  Write-ins
| | 11,206  10,847  85  160
| | 48.58%  47.03%  3.69%  0.69%
|- valign="top"
| rowspan=3| 13 Charles Starr (R)
(Washington) (Yamhill) (Polk)
| 
| Incumbent Senator Starr lost his party's primary to Larry George.
| Larry George (R)  Rick Ross (D)  Write-ins
| |26,504  18,318  117	
| |58.98%  40.76%  0.26%
|-
| |25 Kim Thatcher (R)
| 
| Kim Thatcher (R)  Charles E. Lee (D)  Write-ins
| |11,956  8,977  38
| |57.01%  42.81%  0.18%
|-
| |26 Jerry Krummel (R)
| 
| Jerry Krummel (R)  Lee Coleman (D)  Charles F. Radley (L)  Write-ins
| | 14,424  9,313  617  33
| |59.15%  38.19%  2.53%  0.14%
|- valign="top"
| rowspan=3| 14 Ryan Deckert (D)
(Washington)
| colspan=3| This senate seat not up for election in 2006
|
|-
| |27 Mark Hass (D)
| Incumbent Representative Hass declined to run for a fourth term.
| Tobias Read (D)  Dominic Biggi (R)  Write-ins
| | 14,325  9,706  43	
| | 59.50%  40.32%  0.18%
|-
| |28 Jeff Barker (D)
|
| Jeff Barker (D)  Eldon Derville-Teer (R)  Write-ins
| |10,924  5,912  86
| |64.56%   34.94%  0.51%
|- valign="top"
| rowspan=3| 15 Bruce Starr (R)
(Washington)
|
| Oregonian profile of Napolitano
| Bruce Starr (R)  John Napolitano (D)  Write-ins
| |19,973  16,308  71	
| |54.94%  44.86%  0.20%
|-
| |29 Chuck Riley (D)
| 
| Chuck Riley (D)  Terry Rilling (R)  Scott Harwood (L)  Write-ins
| | 7,987  6,659  769  34	
| | 51.70%  43.10%  4.98%  0.22%
|-
| |30 Derrick Kitts (R)
| Kitts challenged incumbent David Wu for Oregon's 1st US Congress District and lost.
| David Edwards (D)  Everett Curry (R)  Ken Cunningham (C)  Write-ins
| | 12,253  8,965  442  38	
| | 56.47%  41.32%  2.04%  0.18%
|- valign="top"
| rowspan=3| 16 Betsy Johnson (politician) (D) 
Clatsop Columbia (Tillamook) (Washington)
|
|
| Betsy Johnson (politician) (D)  Don Fell (R)  Robert J. Simmering (C)  Write-ins
| | 30,645  16,040  1,429  85	
| |63.58%  33.28%  2.96%  0.18%
|-
| |31 Brad Witt (D)
| 
| Brad Witt (D)  Mike Kocher (R)  Bob Ekström (C)  Write-ins
| |13,975  6,955  2,802  62	
| |58.73%  29.23%  11.78%  0.26%
|-
| |32 Deborah Boone (D)
|
| Deborah Boone (D)  Norm Myers (R)  Write-ins
| | 14,876  9,112  61	
| |61.86%  37.89%  0.25%
|- valign="top"
| rowspan=3| 17 Charlie Ringo (D) 
(Multnomah)
|
| Incumbent Senator Ringo declined to run January 12, 2006
| Brad Avakian (D)  Piotr Kuklinski (R)  Richard Whitehead (L)  John R. Pivarnik (C)  Write-ins
| | 31,612  13,497  1,445  371  89
| |67.24%  28.71%  3.07%  0.79%  0.19%
|-
| |33 Mitch Greenlick (D)
|  
| Mitch Greenlick (D)  Mark Eggleston (R)  David E. Long (L)  Write-ins
| |19,481  7,378  1,080  62	
| |69.57%  26.35%  3.86%  0.22%
|-
| |34 Brad Avakian (D)
| Incumbent Representative Avakian ran in Oregon's 17th Senate district race and won, after Incumbent Senator Ringo declined to run.
|  Suzanne Bonamici (D)  Joan Draper (R)  Gregory F. Rohde (L)  Write-ins
| |11,780  6,902  439  27
| |61.52%  36.05%  2.29%  0.14%
|- valign="top"
| rowspan=3| 18 Ginny Burdick (D)
(Multnomah) (Washington)
| colspan=3| This senate seat not up for election in 2006
| 
|-
| |35 Larry Galizio (D)
|
| Larry Galizio (D)  Shirley Parsons (R)  Write-ins
| |12,628  10,000  47	
| |55.69%  44.10%  0.21%
|-
| |36 Mary Nolan (D)
| 
|Mary Nolan (D)  Frank Dane (L)  Write-ins
| |20,344  3,520  137		
| |84.76%  14.67%  0.57%
|- valign="top"
| rowspan=3| 19 Richard Devlin (D)
(Clackamas)
| 
| Independent candidate Christie M. Schaefer was listed at one point but failed to qualify enough signatures.
| Richard Devlin (D)  David Newell (R)  Marc Delphine (L) Write-ins
| |30,963  18,299  1,218  65	
| |61.26%  36.20%  2.41%  0.13%
|-
| |37 Scott Bruun (R)
| Oregonian article about two of the candidates
| Scott Bruun (R)  Bev Backa (D)  David M. Akin (L)  Write-ins
| |12,531  10,461  507  20 
| |53.28%  44.48%  2.16%  0.09%
|-
| |38 Greg Macpherson (D)
| 
| Greg Macpherson (D)  Fred Bremner (R)  Write-ins
| |18,361  8,335  45	
| |68.66%  31.17%  0.17%
|- valign="top"
| rowspan=3| 20 Kurt Schrader (D)
(Clackamas)
|
| Schrader ran unopposed.  Thomas F. Lemons (R) won his Republican primary for the district, but withdrew July 20.
| Kurt Schrader (D)  Write-ins
| |28,530  1,154
| |96.11%  3.89%
|-
| |39 Wayne Scott (R)
| 
| Wayne Scott (R)  Mike Caudle (D)  Wes Wagner (L)  Write-ins
| |12,247  9,214  819  51	
| |54.84%  41.26%  3.67%  0.23%
|-
| |40 Dave Hunt (D)
| Hunt ran unopposed.
| Dave Hunt (D)  Write-ins
| |13,606  418
| |97.02%  2.98%
|- style="color:darkgreen"
! Senate District, incumbent, county(s)
! House District, incumbent
! Notes
! Candidates
! Votes Garnered
! Margin
|- valign="top"
| rowspan=3| 21 Kate Brown (D)
(Multnomah)
| colspan=3| This senate seat not up for election in 2006
|
|-
| |41 Carolyn Tomei (D)
| Incumbent Representative Tomei ran unopposed.
| Carolyn Tomei (D)  Write-ins 
| |15,998  510			
| |96.91%  3.09%
|-
| |42 Diane Rosenbaum (D)
|
| Diane Rosenbaum (D)  Jeff Cropp (G)  Write-ins
| |20,325  3,870  155
| |83.47%  15.89%  0.64%
|- valign="top"
| rowspan=3| 22 Margaret Carter (D)
(Multnomah)
| colspan=3| This senate seat not up for election in 2006
|
|-
| |43 Chip Shields
| Incumbent Representative Shields ran unopposed.
|Chip Shields (D)  Write-ins 
| |18,340  378
| |97.98%  2.02%
|-
| |44 Gary Hansen (D)
| Incumbent Representative Hansen ran for Multnomah County Commissioner in District 2, and won.
| Tina Kotek (D)  Jay Kushner (R)  Write-ins
| |13,931  3,645  97
| |78.83%  20.62%  0.55%
|- valign="top"
| rowspan=3| 23 Avel Gordly (I)
(Multnomah)
| colspan=3| This senate seat not up for election in 2006.  Senator Gordly dropped her Democratic Party affiliation to register as a non-partisan Independent in June 2006.
|-
| |45 Jackie Dingfelder (D)
| 
| Jackie Dingfelder (D)  Dick Osborne (R)  Write-ins
| |18,460  4,603  73
| |79.79%  19.90%  0.32%
|-
| |46 Steve March (D)
| Incumbent Representative March ran for Multnomah County Auditor, and lost.
| Ben Cannon (D)  William Cornett (R)  Paul Loney (G)  Write-ins
| |16,348  3,493  1,318  75
| |76.99%  16.45%  6.21%  0.35%
|- valign="top"
| rowspan=3| 24 Frank Shields (D)
(Multnomah)
|  
| Incumbent Senator Shields withdrew from the race 3/9/2006.
| Rod Monroe (D)  T.J. Reilly (R)  Ron McCarty (I)  Write-ins
| |17,304  15,483  2,653  85	
| |48.71%  43.58%  7.47%  0.24%
|-
| |47 Jeff Merkley (D)
|
| Jeff Merkley (D)  Bruce McCain (R)  Write-ins
| |11,106  6,192  65
| |63.96%  35.66%  0.37%
|-
| |48 Mike Schaufler (D)
| Republican nominee Dave Mowry withdrew on July 21.
| Mike Schaufler (D)  N. W. (Bill) Stallings (C)  Write-ins
| |11,262  3,672  232
| |74.26%  24.21%  1.53%
|- valign="top"
| rowspan=3| 25 Laurie Monnes Anderson
(Multnomah) (D)
| colspan=3| This senate seat not up for election in 2006
|
|-
| |49 Karen Minnis (R)
| Brad Fudge (L) filed for the ballot, but was disqualified on Sept. 1.  Oregonian coverage of Brading's complaint about campaign tactics
| Karen Minnis (R)  Rob Brading (D)  Write-ins
| |8,601  7,911  92	
| |51.80%  47.65%  0.55%
|-
| |50 John Lim (R)
| Statesman-Journal story about ethics investigation into Lim's travel
| John Lim (R)  Jill Selman-Ringer (D)  Brian D. Lowery (L)  Write-ins
| |11,362  6,107  557  48	
| |62.86%  33.79%  3.08%  0.27%
|- valign="top"
| rowspan=3| 26 Rick Metsger (D) 
(Multnomah) (Clackamas) Hood River
|
|
| Rick Metsger (D)  Carol York (R)  Write-ins
| |25,183  18,964  81 
| |56.94%  42.88%  0.18%
|-
| |51 Linda Flores (R)
| 
| Linda Flores (R)  Ryan Olds (D)  Write-ins
| |11,926  8,755  30
| |57.58%  42.27%  0.14%
|-
| |52 Patti Smith (R)
| 
| Patti Smith (R)  Suzanne VanOrman (D)  Write-ins
| |12,588  9,994  34
| |55.66%  44.19%  0.15%
|- valign="top"
| rowspan=3| 27 Ben Westlund (D)
(Deschutes)
| colspan=3| This senate seat not up for election in 2006.  Westlund dropped (R) party affil to run for Governor as an indep. Withdrew from Gov. race 8/10/06.
|
|-
| |53 Gene Whisnant (R)
| 
| Gene Whisnant (R)  Bill A. Smith (D)  Write-ins
| |16,527  11,406  31
| |59.10%  40.79%  0.11%
|-
| |54 Chuck Burley (R)
| 
| Chuck Burley (R)  Phil Philiben (D)  Write-ins
| |14,780  11,873  67
| |55.31%  44.43%  0.25%
|- valign="top"
| rowspan=3| 28 Doug Whitsett (R)
Lake Crook Klamath (Deschutes) (Jackson)
| colspan=3| This senate seat not up for election in 2006
|
|-
| |55 George Gilman (R)
| Incumbent Representative Gilman ran unopposed.
| George Gilman (R)  Write-ins
| |16,491  417
| |97.53%  2.47%
|-
| |56 Bill Garrard (R)
| 
| Bill Garrard (R)  James Calvert (D)  Write-ins
| |13,759  6,855  46
| |66.60%  33.18%  0.22%
|- valign="top"
| rowspan=3| 29 David Nelson (R)
Morrow Umatilla Union Wallowa
| colspan=3| This senate seat not up for election in 2006
|
|-
| |57 Greg Smith (R)
| Nancy Wolfe won the Democratic party primary, but withdrew. St. Germain was nominated to take her place 8/7/06.
| Greg Smith (R)  Tonia St. Germain (D)  Write-ins
| |14,119  6,058  45
| |69.82%  29.96%  0.22%
|-
| |58 Bob Jenson (R)
| 
| Bob Jenson (R)  Ben Talley (D)  Write-ins
| |10,194  4,629  31 
| |68.63%  31.16%  0.21%
|- valign="top"
| rowspan=3| 30 Ted Ferrioli (R)
Wasco Sherman Gilliam Jefferson Wheeler (Deschutes) Grant Baker Harney Malheur
| colspan=3| This senate seat not up for election in 2006
|
|-
| |59 John H. Dallum (R)
| 
| John H. Dallum (R)  Jim Gilbertson (D)  Write-ins
| |10,733  10,453  32 
| |50.58%  49.26%  0.15%
|-
| |60 R. Tom Butler (R)
| 
| R. Tom Butler (R)  Peter Hall (D)  Write-ins
| |13,362  4,575  46
| |74.30%  25.44%  0.26%
|- style="color:darkgreen"
! Senate District, incumbent, county(s)
! House District, incumbent
! Notes
! Candidates
! Votes Garnered
! Margin
|}

 Candidates (Executive) 

Oregon Blue Book list of elected executive officials

 Governor 

Incumbent Governor Ted Kulongoski (D) won the election.

 Democratic Party

winner in primary:
 Ted Kulongoski (incumbent)

losers in primary:
 Jim Hill, Pete Sorenson

 Republican Party

winner in primary:
 Ron Saxton
losers in primary:
 Jason A. Atkinson, Kevin Mannix, W. Ames Curtright, David W. Beem, William E. Spidal, Gordon Leitch, Bob Leonard Forthan

 Pacific Green Party
 Joe Keating

 Constitution Party

 Libertarian Party
 Richard Morley

 Independent
 Ben Westlund gathered enough signatures to appear on the ballot, but withdrew from the race August 10.

 Labor Commissioner Commissioner of the Bureau of Labor and Industrieswinner in primary:
 Dan Gardner

 Superintendent of Schools Superintendent of Public Instructionwinner in primary:
 Susan Castillo
loser in primary:
 Deborah L. Andrews

 Candidates (Judicial) 
Many judicial positions are not contested. Incumbents are rarely opposed, and when they resign, it is often timed such that the Governor chooses their replacement.

If a judicial position becomes vacant and the Governor declines to make an appointment, it must be filled at the next General Election. If it's not too late to file for a Primary Election, candidates will appear on that ballot in the first round of a runoff election. If there is no Primary before the next General Election, all candidates appear on the General Election ballot, and a plurality vote may determine the winner.

 Oregon Supreme Court 

 Position 2 
Incumbent Judge Paul De Muniz sought reelection and was the only candidate to file. He won easily in the primary election against only write-in candidate opposition.

 Position 3 
Incumbent Judge Robert D. (Skip) Durham sought reelection and was the only candidate to file. He won easily in the primary election against only write-in candidate opposition.

 Position 6 
Incumbent Judge Wallace P. Carson, Jr. of Oregon Supreme Court, Position 6, decided to retire after 34 years on the bench. Three candidates entered the race to succeed him:

 Virginia Linder, who had since 1997 been an Oregon Court of Appeals judge (winner)
 Jack Roberts, former Oregon Commissioner of Labor and Industries
 W. Eugene (Gene) Hallman, Pendleton attorney

No candidate received a majority in the primary election, and Linder and Roberts advanced to the general election. Linder won by 51.75 percent of the vote.

 Oregon Court of Appeals 

 Circuit Court Judge of the Circuit Court, 1st District, Position 5 (Jackson County)
 Raymond B. White - 21,070
 Other - 240Judge of the Circuit Court, 1st District, Position 9 (Jackson County)

Primary:
 Ron Grensky - 15,197
 Lisa C. Greif - 11,651
 Joe Charter - 4,762
 Paul L. Henderson III - 1,602
 Other - 49

Runoff:
 Ron Grensky - 39,954
 Lisa C. Greif - 29,291
 Other - 130Judge of the Circuit Court, 2nd District, Position 1 (Lane County)
 Karsten H. Rasmussen - 39,897
 Other - 307Judge of the Circuit Court, 2nd District, Position 3 (Lane County)
 Lyle C. Velure - 38,112
 Other - 594Judge of the Circuit Court, 2nd District, Position 9 (Lane County)
 Gregory G. Foote - 40,765
 Other - 367Judge of the Circuit Court, 2nd District, Position 14 (Lane County)
 Debra Vogt - 64,209
 Alan Leiman - 49,156
 Other - 470Judge of the Circuit Court, 4th District, Position 4 (Multnomah County)
 Adrienne C. Nelson - 134,269
 Other - 3,464Judge of the Circuit Court, 4th District, Position 28 (Multnomah County)
 Judith Hudson Matarazzo - 39,782
 Mary Overgaard - 38,323
 James J. McIntyre - 31,408
 Mark K. Kramer - 25,046
 Ulanda L. Watkins - 18,368
 Christopher D. Wright - 11,641
 Charles L. Best - 8,961
 Theodore E. Sims - 7,652
 James E. Leuenberger - 2,506
 Other - 1,580Judge of the Circuit Court, 4th District, Position 31 (Multnomah County)
 Cheryl Albrecht - 93,528
 Kathleen Payne - 78,778
 Other - 1,836Judge of the Circuit Court, 4th District, Position 37 (Multnomah County)
 Leslie Roberts - 116,321
 Other - 34,227Judge of the Circuit Court, 6th District, Position 5 (Morrow and Umatilla counties)
 Christopher R. Brauer - 11,003
 Annetta L. Spicer - 8,631
 Other - 45Judge of the Circuit Court, 14th District, Position 2 (Josephine County)
 Pat Wolke - 19,204
 Other - 367Judge of the Circuit Court, 15th District, Position 3 (Coos and Cutty counties)
 Jesse Margolis - 7,569
 Other - 7,449Judge of the Circuit Court, 16th District, Position 5 (Douglas County)
 George Ambrosini - 20,741
 William (Bill) Marshal - 11,810
 Nancy Cook - 5,620
 Other - 52Judge of the Circuit Court, 18th District, Position 3 (Clatsop County)
 Cindee S. Matyahs - 7,392
 Don H. Haller, III - 5,829
 Other - 23Judge of the Circuit Court, 20th District, Position 6 (Washington County)
 Charlie Bailey''' - 71,811
 Vincent A. Deguc - 41,813
 Other - 578

 District Attorneys 

 See also 
 Oregon primary election, 2006
 Oregon gubernatorial election, 2006
 Portland, Oregon area elections, 2006
 Seventy-third Oregon Legislative Assembly
 Seventy-fourth Oregon Legislative Assembly

 References 
Oregon Secretary of State:
 Secretary of State's Statistical Summary for the 2006 General Election
 List of candidates for May 16 Primary Election
 List of candidates for Nov 7 General Election
 2006 Primary Election Voters' Pamphlet, with official results
 2006 General Election Voters' Pamphlet, with official results

Election websites from The Oregonian:
 Oregonian newspaper Elections site
 Election results

Endorsements:
 Endorsements by the Willamette Week Endorsements by the Portland Mercury''

Specific references:

 
Oregon
Oregon elections by year